James Luke Cavanagh (21 June 1913 – 19 August 1990) was an Australian politician and government minister.

Cavanagh was born in Rosewater, South Australia and educated at the Dominican School in North Adelaide. He left school at 14 to work as a plasterer. He became an active member of the pacifist League against War and Fascism and continued to work as a plasterer during World War II. He was the Secretary of the Plasterers Society of South Australia from 1945 to 1962.

Cavanagh was elected to the Senate at the 1961 election. He was Minister for Works from 1972 to 1973, Minister for Aboriginal Affairs from 1973 to 1975 and Minister for Police and Customs in 1975. He did not stand for re-election at the 1980 election and retired from the Senate in June 1981.

References

 

1913 births
1990 deaths
1975 Australian constitutional crisis
Australian Labor Party members of the Parliament of Australia
Members of the Australian Senate for South Australia
Members of the Australian Senate
Members of the Cabinet of Australia
Australian plasterers
20th-century Australian politicians